Levi Hanssen (born 24 February 1988) is a footballer who currently plays for HB Tórshavn. He usually plays as a left midfielder or up-front.

Hanssen was born in New Zealand, but grew up in Tórshavn, Faroe Islands

Previously he played for EB/Streymur, B36 Tórshavn and Skála ÍF. He has been capped at full international level by the Faroe Islands with 3 matches. He has also played for Faroe Islands U21, U19 and U17.

References

https://www.thefinalball.com/player/levi_hanssen/2009_10/profile/139/default/74825

External links

1988 births
Living people
Association footballers from Wellington City
New Zealand association footballers
Faroe Islands international footballers
B36 Tórshavn players
EB/Streymur players
Havnar Bóltfelag players
Faroe Islands Premier League players
Faroe Islands under-21 international footballers

Association football forwards
Faroese footballers
Faroe Islands youth international footballers